Gowdlar is a village in Gerdeh Rural District, in the Central District of Namin County, Ardabil Province, Iran. At the 2006 census, its population was 27, in 7 families.

References 

Towns and villages in Namin County